Mick Lonergan (born 1940) is an Irish retired hurler who played as a full-back for the Tipperary senior team.

Lonergan joined the team during the 1962 championship and was a semi-regular member of the team until he retired from inter-county hurling after the 1967 championship. He made his debut coming on as a substitute in the 1964 All-Ireland Senior Hurling Championship and also came on in the 1967 final defeat. During that time he won one All-Ireland winners' medal on the field of play.	

At club level Lonergan played with the Moycarkey–Borris club.

Honours

Tipperary
All-Ireland Senior Hurling Championship (1): 1964

References

1940 births
Living people
Moycarkey-Borris hurlers
Tipperary inter-county hurlers
All-Ireland Senior Hurling Championship winners